Road Fools is the first extended play by Anybody Killa. Released in 2005, it peaked at number 23 on the Billboard Top Independent Albums chart.

Track listing 
"Intro" - 2:45
"Feel This Way" - 4:19
"Way We Roll" - 3:37
"Up My Sleeve" 2:40
"Are We There Yet?" - 3:26
"Rage" (performed by the Krazy Klan) - 3:16
"All-4-U" - 5:56

References

2005 EPs
Anybody Killa EPs
Psychopathic Records EPs